George Willis Botsford (May 9, 1862, West Union, Iowa – December 13, 1917, New York City) was an American classicist, ancient historian, and professor of history, specializing in Greek and Roman history. He is known for his textbooks on Greek and Roman history.

Botsford graduated from the University of Nebraska–Lincoln in 1884 with an A.B. and in 1889 with an A.M. From 1884 to 1886 he studied at Johns Hopkins University. From 1886 to 1890 he was a professor of Greek at Kalamazoo College. In 1891 he graduated with a Ph.D. from Cornell University. His Ph.D. dissertation The Development of the Athenian Constitution was published in 1893.

From 1891 to 1893 he was an instructor at Worcester Academy. From 1893 to 1895 he was a professor of Greek at Bethany College in West Virginia. At Harvard University he was an instructor from 1895 to 1901. At Columbia University he was from 1902 to 1903 a lecturer in ancient history, from 1903 to 1905 an instructor, from 1905 to 1910 an adjunct professor, and from 1910 a full professor, retaining his professorship until his death. In 1917 Botsford died suddenly in his office at Columbia University.

For many years Botsford was on the editorial board of the Political Science Quarterly. He published articles in the Classical Review, The American Historical Review, The Nation, and the Encyclopaedia Britannica. His textbooks on Greek and Roman history gained prominence in secondary schools and colleges. In connection with his scholarly research he travelled to Italy and Greece.

He married Lillie M. Shaw on August 30, 1891 in Kalamazoo, Michigan. They had a son and a daughter. Their son, Jay Barrett Botsford (1893–1938), became a history professor at Brown University.

Selected publications
  
 
 
 
  with Lillie Shaw Botsford
 
 
  with Lillie Shaw Botsford
  as editor with Ernest Gottlieb Sihler
  with Jay Barrett Botsford; 1922 revised edition
  (posthumous), 520 pages, ed. Jay Barrett Botsford (New York, 1922; rev. ed. by C. A. Robinson, Jr., 1939; 5th ed. by Donald Kagan, 1960).

References

External links
 

1862 births
1917 deaths
University of Nebraska–Lincoln alumni
Cornell University alumni
Columbia University faculty
American classical scholars
Classical scholars of Columbia University
Historians of antiquity
Scholars of ancient Greek history
Historians of ancient Rome